JT3 may refer to:

 John Thompson III, former head coach of the men's basketball team at Georgetown University
 Pratt & Whitney JT3C, a turbojet engine
 Pratt & Whitney JT3D, a turbofan engine